Yabu Meizan (birth name Yabu Masashichi, January 20, 18531934) was a Japanese artist and workshop owner known for painting on porcelain. His studio produced high-end Satsuma ware, primarily for the export market. That term was originally coined for artistic painted porcelain from the Satsuma Province. Eventually it expanded to include low-quality porcelain that was mass-produced for export, whereas Meizan was one of the artists who continued the tradition of high artistic quality while also successfully exporting. He is regarded as the "prince" of this medium and today his works are sought after by collectors.

Biography 

Yabu Meizan was born on January 20, 1853, in Nagahori, Osaka. In 1880 he opened his workshop in Osaka, employing and training artists. Wares were brought from the kiln of Chin Jukan in Satsuma Province to Osaka to be decorated. The American art museum founder Charles Parsons recounts a visit to Meizan's workshop in his book Notes of a Trip around the World in 1894 and 1895."He is very celebrated. He had 17 men and boys at work, all decorating. He makes the designs and watches them carefully in executing the work. Some are very wonderful workers. All is order, neatness and silence, no words spoken."

Meizan actively marketed his work internationally as well as domestically, taking an active role in organising the presentation of Japanese wares at world's fairs. This led to acclaim as well as sales. His success inspired another workshop to use his name and imitate his style, without matching his subtlety or detail. His career declined during World War I as the war and economic turmoil made it difficult to run an export business. Japanese art was also falling out of favour with American and European buyers, who gradually turned to China.

Style 
Meizan's works are characterised by minute decoration applied using copper plate designs. These engraved copper plates were used to print the designs on paper, which would then be cut to provide stencils for painting on vases or plates. His decorations used Chinese and Buddhist subjects until the 1890s, when he adopted more Japanese symbolism, such as fishermen or fighting samurai. He would draw from or copy popular prints by artists including Hiroshige. Over the course of his career, the designs included more and more detail. A single work might depict thousands or flowers or butterflies, or hundreds of people in a procession. Towards the end of his career he took a different approach, covering whole vases in a single motif. This new artistic direction, which may have been inspired by critics' opinions, was a commercial failure at the time; buyers much preferred the crowded style.

Exhibitions 
From 1885 to 1916, Meizan displayed his art works at a number of national exhibitions and world's fairs, winning multiple medals. These included the Fourth Kyoto Exhibition of 1885 (where he won a bronze medal), the Paris Exposition Universelle of 1899 and again in 1900, the Louisiana Purchase Exhibition of 1904 and the London Japan–British Exhibition of 1910. For the Louisiana Purchase Exhibition, Meizan was appointed as secretary of the Japan Exhibits Association, organising the arrangement and decoration of the hall. His final international exhibition was the 1915 Panama–Pacific International Exposition in San Francisco.

Outside of Japan a large collection of his art works form part of the Khalili Collection of Japanese Art. The Walters Art Museum and the Metropolitan Museum of Art also hold pieces. Works by Meizan were included in exhibitions drawn from the Khalili Collections at the National Museum of Wales, Cardiff, in 1994 and 1995, in the Wilmington Arts Centre, Delaware, in 1999, Portland Art Museum in 2002, and in the Van Gogh Museum, Amsterdam, in 2006.

Gallery

References

Sources

Further reading 

 

Japanese ceramists
Japanese porcelain
1853 births
1934 deaths
People from Osaka